Clive Doucet (born 1946) is a Canadian writer and politician. He served as the Ottawa City Councillor for Capital Ward from 1997 to 2010 and ran unsuccessfully for Mayor of Ottawa in the 2010 Ottawa municipal election, finishing third with 15 per cent of the vote. Eight years later, he again ran unsuccessfully for Mayor of Ottawa, this time finishing second with 22 per cent of the vote.

Early life

Doucet was born in 1946 in London, England to an Acadian serviceman from Grand Étang and an English war bride. Doucet grew up in the city of Ottawa, Ontario, having moved there at the age of six. He also spent some of his youth in St. John's, Newfoundland. Doucet was raised as a Catholic, and his mother was Protestant. He became a Quaker in 1980. He first came to Ottawa in his teens when his father worked there. Doucet played for the Carleton Ravens football team for one season, and then moved to the University of Toronto. A football injury took him out of that sport and into the sport of rowing. He received a master's degree in urban anthropology from the University of Montreal. In his younger days, he spent a summer working in a rock copper mine in British Columbia and helped build the National Arts Centre as a construction worker. Before entering politics, Doucet was a municipal affairs policy advisor.

Politics
In the 1997 regional elections, Doucet ran for Ottawa-Carleton Regional Council in Capital Ward, which includes The Glebe, Old Ottawa South, Old Ottawa East, part of Riverview Park, Carleton University, and Heron Park. He was an activist against the proposed Bronson Freeway, which propelled him to victory.

Central to his political platform has been the creation of a light rail rapid transit system across Ottawa manifested to date with the O-Train demonstration project (today's Trillium Line).

On 6 July 2010, Doucet announced his candidacy for Mayor of Ottawa in the 2010 Ottawa municipal election. Doucet joined a record number of 115 candidates running for municipal office in 2010, of which 15 challenged mayoral incumbent Larry O'Brien. Doucet placed third with 15 per cent of the vote.

During the 2018 Ontario election campaign, Doucet volunteered in Ottawa Centre for NDP candidate Joel Harden.

On July 27, 2018, Doucet announced that he would once again be running for Mayor of Ottawa in the 2018 Ottawa municipal election. Doucet placed second behind incumbent mayor Jim Watson who he had also lost to in 2010. He won 22% of the vote.

Doucet announced he will be running for the Green Party of Canada in the 2019 Canadian federal election in the riding of Cape Breton—Canso, the riding of his secondary residence of Grand Étang, Nova Scotia.

Publications
Throughout his career, Doucet has been a writer of novels, poetry, plays, and non-fiction, often writing about his Acadian roots. His most recent book, Urban Meltdown: Cities, Climate Change and Politics as Usual, was published by New Society Publishers in 2007. In its review, The Walrus wrote "When Doucet speaks from the firm ground of experience as city councillor, his sharply logical solutions to municipal problems seem both hopeful and achievable."

Fiction
Disneyland Please, novel, 1978, shortlisted for the W.H. Smith First Novel Award
John Coe's War, novel, 1983
Gospel According to Mary Magdalene, novel, 1990
The Priest's Boy, linked short stories, 1992

Non-fiction
My Grandfather's Cape Breton, originally 1980, republished in 2003 –  a memoir of summer boyhood visits to his grandfather on the family farm on Cape Breton Island in the 1960s.
Lost and Found in Acadie (2004), a meditation on Acadian history, the Great Expulsion of 1755 and his visit to the Second Acadian World Congress in Louisiana in 1999.
Notes from Exile, 1999 – profiles his visit to the 1994 First Acadian World Congress in New Brunswick.
Acadian Memories, 2005 – collaboration with photographer Francois Gaudet, a coffee table book keepsake of the Third Acadian World Congress held in Ste Anne, Nova Scotia in 2004.

Poetry
Before Star Wars, 1981
Debris of Planets, 1993
Looking for Henry, 1999 – an epic poem meditating on the deportation of Acadians in 1755 contrasted to the defeat of the Metis Nation in 1885, and how the victors get to write history.
Canal Seasons, 2003

Plays
Hatching Eggs, National Arts Centre, 1976
A Very Desirable Residence, Penguin Performance Company, 1978
Chicken Delight, CBC Playhouse (radio), 1978
May the Best Man Win
The Chez Lucien is Dead (with Wayne Rostad)

Electoral record

Federal

Municipal

Mayoral

City Councillor

References

External links
Official site

20th-century Canadian poets
20th-century Canadian male writers
Canadian male poets
20th-century Canadian novelists
20th-century Canadian dramatists and playwrights
21st-century Canadian novelists
Canadian male novelists
Acadian people
Acadian history
Writers from Ottawa
Ottawa city councillors
Living people
Université de Montréal alumni
University of Toronto alumni
1946 births
British emigrants to Canada
Canadian Quakers
Converts to Quakerism
20th-century Quakers
Writers from St. John's, Newfoundland and Labrador
People from Inverness County, Nova Scotia
Canadian players of Canadian football
Canadian male rowers
Carleton University alumni
Carleton Ravens football players
Ottawa-Carleton regional councillors
Canadian male dramatists and playwrights
21st-century Canadian male writers
Green Party of Canada candidates in the 2019 Canadian federal election